The First Church of Christ, Scientist in Manhattan is a 1903 building located at Central Park West and 96th Street in the Upper West Side of Manhattan, New York City.  The building is a designated New York City landmark.

Architecture

The building, designed by Carrère & Hastings, was completed in 1903, is described by New York Times architectural historian Christopher Gray as "one of the city's most sumptuous churches."  The style reminiscent of the churches of Nicholas Hawksmoor, a combination of English Baroque and French Beaux-Arts detailing. The building featured stained-glass windows by John LaFarge. The window over the front door was named "Touch Me Not" and was based on John 20:17, depicting Jesus' encounter with Mary Magdalene outside the tomb.

It featured mosaics, gold-plated chandeliers, marble floors, curved pews made of Circassian walnut, and elevators called "moving rooms" because they were large enough to hold 20 people.

The church was designated a New York City landmark in 1974, and is a contributing property to the federally designated Central Park West Historic District.

Building use

In 2004 the building was sold to the Crenshaw Christian Center and the Christian Science congregation merged with the congregation of the Second Church of Christ, Scientist.

In June 2014, after almost ten years in the building, the Crenshaw Christian Center sold the building to 361 Central Park L.L.C. for $26 million. The new owner planned to convert the 47,000-square-foot structure to condominiums. However, the condominium plan was rejected by the zoning appears board. In January 2018 the Children's Museum of Manhattan announced that it had acquired the building.  In June 2020 the renovation plan was approved by the city's Landmarks Preservation Commission.

Congregation
The congregation was organized in 1886 by Augusta Emma Stetson.  The congregation gave Stetson the lot adjacent to the Church on West 96th St, where she lived in a neo-Georgian house.  Stetson's house was demolished in 1930, replaced by a "mild(ly) Art Deco" apartment building designed by Thomas W. Lamb.

The congregation met in rented space before construction of the church.

References

Christian Science churches in New York City
Churches in Manhattan
New York City Designated Landmarks in Manhattan
Historic district contributing properties in Manhattan
Carrère and Hastings buildings
Central Park West Historic District
Baroque Revival architecture in New York City